Hovingham Spa railway station was located just north of the village of Hovingham in the Ryedale area of North Yorkshire, England and opened in 1853. Regular passenger service ceased in 1930 but freight traffic and occasional special passenger trains continued until complete closure on 10 August 1964. It was part of the Thirsk and Malton (T&M) rail route, which paralleled today's B1257 road from Hovingham to Malton.

The station had a single platform on the up side of the line, which was originally very low, but which was in 1865 partially raised to the NER standard height of 2' 6". The station offices were incorporated in the stationmaster's house, a two-storey brick building. The goods yard, mainly on the up side of the line, had up to six sidings which served the coal drops, two warehouses, a cattle dock, and another loading dock, and handled timber traffic. In the 1950s goods traffic increased due to limestone from nearby Wath quarry being in demand from the steel industry. The goods yard was extended in 1948 with a new loading dock. The limestone traffic practically ceased by 1960 when the stone was not needed any more for lining the steel furnaces.

References

External links
 Hovingham station on navigable 1947 O. S. map

Disused railway stations in North Yorkshire
Railway stations in Great Britain opened in 1853
Railway stations in Great Britain closed in 1964
Former North Eastern Railway (UK) stations
Hovingham